Sisurcana atricaput is a species of moth of the family Tortricidae. It is found in Paraná, Brazil.

The wingspan is about 16 mm. The ground colour of the forewings is brownish yellow with more ferruginous suffusions and sparse brown scales. There are two small, blackish spots near the mid-costa. The hindwings are white cream with greyer strigulae (fine streaks).

Etymology
The species name refers to the colouration of the head.

References

Moths described in 2011
Sisurcana
Moths of South America
Taxa named by Józef Razowski